I'On is a mixed-use New Urbanist "Traditional Neighborhood Development (TND)" style community located in Mt. Pleasant, South Carolina, United States just northeast of Charleston. I'On was one of the earliest full-time residential new urbanist communities developed in the US.

Location and origin

I'On is approximately three miles (5 km) east of the Arthur Ravenel Bridge, which connects Charleston and Mount Pleasant. Adjacent to the I'on Club is East Cooper Montessori Charter School, the first public charter Montessori school in the state.

 The community was founded and planned under the direction of Vince Graham, who previously established the Newpoint community in Beaufort, South Carolina. Founded on April 30, 1995, I'On was planned as an example of the new urbanism, which includes traditional neighborhood developments. I'On was designed by the town planning firms of Dover, Kohl & Partners and Duany Plater-Zyberk & Company. The community was controversial when proposed and initial plans for a more urban and diverse village of over 1,200 units, including multifamily homes and rented residences, were eventually compromised in the planning process to a buildout of approximately 762 single family homes, a village square, and locations for civic buildings such as churches and schools. Development plans were delayed by a lengthy legal contest with the Town of Mount Pleasant which ended with the South Carolina Supreme Court ruling in the I'On Company's favor.

Description
Features of the community include extensive sidewalks, shared public green spaces, trails and a grid of narrow, traffic calming streets. This private/public ownership of the neighborhood allows the community landscaping and amenities to be privately maintained, while the streets are maintained by the town. (resulting in a low HOA fee). Most homes have a front porch of not less than eight feet (2.46 m) in depth. Ceiling heights of 10 feet+ (3.1 m), raised foundations and smaller lot sizes give the community a dense, vertical feel. Overall density of the neighborhood is about 3.8 units per acre, with large amounts of the community's area being taken up by parks, trails, lakes, sidewalks and other common areas.

A commercial center called I'On Square serves as the community gateway. The community is connected to surrounding communities by five roads and two pedestrian walkways.

Natural features include a wildlife refuge, called the Rookery, 6 miles of walking trails, 2.5 miles of marsh front paths, a deep water access boat ramp, 3 crab docks, outdoor amphitheater, boathouse, 2 lakes, and 12 pocket parks.

The community is home to East Cooper Montessori Charter School, one of the first successful Charter Schools in South Carolina. The school enrolls about 250 students in grades 1-8. The school's campus is small and students make use of community playgrounds and green spaces which are within walking distance.

The I'On Club  offers year-round extensive tennis with 7 clay courts, aquatics with 3 pools (junior olympic saline, adult lounge pool saline, shaded baby pool), as well as a gym, personal trainers, group classes, and The Porch at I'On restaurant.

As of 2015, the community is nearly completed with 756 homes.

Businesses include the I'On Inn, Square Onion gourmet deli, O'Brion's Pub, Grace Salon Spa, Community Table restaurant, and others.

The maintenance and daily operations of I'On are provided by the on site full-time Community Manager and the Assistant Manager. The 7 person Assembly (HOA) Board is elected by the residents for 2 year terms. Their responsibility is to provide strategic guidance, governance and financial oversight of the Assembly (HOA). The Board works with the Town of Mount Pleasant for road maintenance and emergency services. The Board also collaborates with the I'On Design Committee, responsible for the 'Lowcountry Vernacular' consistency of design in I'On.

Name

The community takes its name from Jacob Bond I'On. I'On was the first mayor of the Town of Sullivan's Island. A monument to I'On erected in the 19th century stands in the Northwest part of the community at the center of a  historic family cemetery which is open to visitors. A historical marker with facts about Jacob Bond I'On's life can be found where the community is entered from a roundabout on Mathis Ferry Road.

Community
Communications within I'On are a priority. The community distributes an annual resident directory and emails a monthly newsletter to all residents. Both of these publications are created by the volunteer neighborhood communications committee. The neighborhood consists primarily of custom built homes, a few spec homes, and currently no attached properties (condos and townhomes). There are no plans to allow them in the future.

The spirit of I'On is maintained by the I'On Trust. A legally separate, non-profit established from the beginning of the development's existence, this volunteer Trust Board is elected by its neighbors/members. The Trust Board organizes community events throughout the year.

Place in New Urbanism

As one of the early examples of new urbanist traditional neighborhood development, I'On draws many visitors interested in town planning. Proximity to Mount Pleasant's historic "Old Village" from which I'On drew many planning elements and world-famous downtown Charleston, South Carolina allows planners to experience and compare both the new community and its historic models.

Other new urbanist communities include Seaside and Celebration in Florida and Kentlands, Maryland.

References

External links
 http://www.ioncommunity.com - Official Website

New Urbanism communities
Geography of Charleston County, South Carolina
Populated places established in 1995